Disaster DIY is a show on HGTV Canada about "Do-It-Yourselfer"s who have failed at their own home renovations and are in desperate need of some on-the-job training. The host is Bryan Baeumler and it is directed by Craig Goodwill. The projects are located in the Greater Toronto Area. The show is produced by Si Entertainment.

Cottage Edition
"Disaster DIY – Cottage Edition" is a special version of the show, in which the projects are located just outside the Greater Toronto Area, in cottage areas.

Episodes

Season 1

Season 2

Season 3

Season 4
Most episodes feature shopping at Lowe's (the show's main sponsor).

Season 5

References

External links
Official page on HGTV site

HGTV (Canada) original programming
2000s Canadian reality television series
2010s Canadian reality television series
2007 Canadian television series debuts
2011 Canadian television series endings
Bryan Baeumler television franchise
English-language television shows